A by-election was held in the state electoral district of Cabramatta on 1 February 1986. The by-election was triggered by the resignation of  MP Eric Bedford, who had served as Minister for Education and Minister for Planning in the Wran Labor government.

By-elections for the seats of Canterbury and Kiama were held on the same day.

Results

 MP Eric Bedford resigned.

See also
Electoral results for the district of Cabramatta
List of New South Wales state by-elections

References

1986 elections in Australia
New South Wales state by-elections
1980s in New South Wales